Hamberg Glacier is one of the major glaciers in King Christian X Land, Northeast Greenland. Administratively it lies in the Northeast Greenland National Park zone. 

The area where the glacier flows is remote and uninhabited.

History
This glacier was first mapped in 1932 by Lauge Koch during the Three-year Expedition to East Greenland. It was named after Swedish mineralogist, geographer and Arctic explorer Axel Hamberg (1863–1933).

Geography
The Hamberg Glacier flows from the eastern side of the Greenland ice sheet in the west and swings to the NE to join Gerard de Geer Glacier. To the northwest of the bend lies J. L. Mowinckel Land. To the SE the glacier has a branch joining the Jaette Glacier. 

Louise Boyd Land lies to the east of the eastern section of the glacier and Fraenkel Land further to the southeast. 

There is a small region of nunataks off the upper western section of the glacier.

See also
List of glaciers in Greenland

References

External links
GNET GPS Station Hamberg Gletscher | Isaaffik
Northeast Greenland, Louise Boyd Land, First Ascents - 2003
Glaciers of Greenland